Kaspiysk is a city in the Republic of Dagestan, Russia, located on the Caspian Sea,  southeast of Makhachkala. The 2010 Russian census recorded the city as being the fourth-largest in Dagestan. It is a working-class satellite city to Makhachkala.

Climate
Kaspiysk has a cold semi-arid climate (Köppen climate classification: BSk).

History
The city is one of the newer urban centers in Dagestan. It began in 1932 as a worker's encampment, servicing the needs of the nearby naval diesel engine manufacturer, Dagdizel. At the time, it was called Dvigatelstroy, based upon the Russian word for "engine". During World War II, the site saw much growth due to the war effort, and became a center for major arms producers. In 1947, the settlement received the status of a city, and was given its current name, reflecting its location on the shores of the Caspian Sea.

Chechen Wars
On November 16, 1996, 68 people were killed in a Chechen bomb attack targeting an apartment.

On May 9, 2002, 43 people were killed after a bombing during a Victory Day Parade.

Administrative and municipal status
Within the framework of administrative divisions, it is incorporated as the City of Kaspiysk—an administrative unit with the status equal to that of the districts. As a municipal division, the City of Kaspiysk is incorporated as Kaspiysk Urban Okrug.

Demographics
Population:    43,000 (1972).

Ethnic groups (2002 census):
Dargins (20.7%)
Lezgins (18.0%)
Laks (15.1%)
Russians (13.2%)
Avars (13.1%)
Kumyks (9.9%)
Tabasarans (5.2%)
Aghuls (1.1%)
Azerbaijanis (0.9%)

Religion
Predominant faiths of Kaspiysk city are Sunni Islam and Orthodox Christianity.

Islam

Russian Orthodox
The city belongs to the Diocese of Makhachkala. Kaspiysk parish was formed in 1990 with the blessings of the Metropolitan of Stavropol and Baku, and was officially registered in 1994. In 2000, the community consecrated St. Kazan Church.

Seventh Day Adventists
In 2010, the Seventh Day Adventists dedicated a house of worship in the city. It became the target of two explosives attacks within two months.

Economy
The city is home to:
 Dagdizel machine-building factory, founded in 1932. It produces diesel engines, electric motors, torpedoes, and other products for the Russian Navy.
 JSC Caspian Sea precision mechanics - machine-building factory, founded in 1960. It manufactures maritime navigation equipment for military and commercial use.
 a brick factory
 a stone processing factory.

At the North side of the city is a seaport.

Sports
The city hosts the Anzhi Arena stadium, home to the FC Anzhi Makhachkala Russian football club, which competes in the Russian Football Premier League.

The city was to bid to host the 2018 Summer Youth Olympics, however the bid was abandoned due to a lack of government support.

Notable people
 Gaydarbek Gaydarbekov (born 1976), boxer
 Sultan Ibragimov (born 1975), boxer
 Leonid Mikhelson (born 1955), entrepreneur, billionaire
 Magomed Omarow (born 1989), boxer
 Zamira Rakhmanova (born 1985), wrestler
 Albert Selimov (born 1986), boxer

Miscellaneous
The city is home to a large naval storage facility that houses Russian hovercraft and ekranoplans.

References

Notes

Sources

External links

Official website of Kaspiysk 
Kaspiysk Business Directory  

Cities and towns in Dagestan
Populated coastal places in Russia
Russian and Soviet Navy bases
Populated places on the Caspian Sea
Monotowns in Russia